Jai Ram Thakur (born 6 January 1965) is an Indian politician, and was the Chief Minister of the state of Himachal Pradesh from 2017 to 2022. He is serving his sixth term as MLA in the Himachal Pradesh Legislative Assembly, winning continuously since 1998 and has previously served as a Cabinet Minister in the Bharatiya Janata Party Government of Himachal Pradesh. Thakur was the Minister of Rural Development and Panchayati Raj from 2009 to 2012. He is serving as Leader of opposition in current legislative assembly of the state.He is elected to Himachal Pradesh Legislative Assembly from Seraj Assembly constituency of Mandi district. He won his first election in the year 1998 from now delimited constituency of Chachiot (Seraj).

Early life and education
Jai Ram Thakur was born to a poor farming family in Village- Tandi, Tehsil- Thunag of Mandi; he was fourth among five siblings – two sisters and three brothers. His father's name is Jhethu Ram who used to work as mason and mother's name is Briku Devi.

Thakur who spent his childhood in acute poverty attained his primary education from Kurani School.
Then he did graduation B.A. from Vallabh Government College, Mandi, (Graduated in 1987). Later he did Post Graduation (M.A.) from Panjab University, Chandigarh.

Family overview
Thakur is married to ABVP colleague Dr. Sadhana Thakur and they have two daughters. Sadhana is a doctor, born to a Kannadiga family in Jaipur and brought up there. The couple has two daughters. Both daughters are studying MBBS in Himachal Pradesh. Elder is already studying in Dr. Rajendra Prasad Government Medical College, Tanda while younger got selected to Shri Lal Bahadur Shastri Government Medical College, Ner Chowk in the year 2018.

Politics
He was introduced to the Akhil Bharatiya Vidyarthi Parishad during his graduation at Vallabh Government College Mandi, and won first election under the flag of ABVP, beginning his long association with the student organization. He remained Joint Secretary, State ABVP, 1986; Organizing Secretary, ABVP (J&K), 1989–93; State Secretary, Bharatiya Janata Yuva Morcha; 1993–95; President: State Bhartiya Janata Party Yuva Morcha, ii) B.J.P. District Mandi 2000–03; Vice President State BJP, 2003–05; and President State Bhartiya Janata Party 2006–09.

Elected to State Legislative Assembly in 1998, and re-elected in 2003 and 2007 from Chachiot Assembly Constituency which after the delimitation has been renamed as Seraj. Remained Chairman, General Development Committee & Education Committee; and vice-chairman, State Civil Supplies Corporation Ltd.

In the year 2009, he was inducted to the council of Ministers and given the portfolio of rural development and Panchayati raj. Also remained chairman, Rural Planning Committee and Member of various other House Committees before being inducted into Council of Minister as Panchayati Raj and Rural Development Minister on 09-07-2012.

Elected to the State Legislative Assembly for a consecutive fourth term in December 2012.

Chief Minister 

In the 2017 Assembly elections, BJP won a two-thirds majority but its Chief Ministerial candidate Prem Kumar Dhumal received a shocking defeat from the Sujanpur assembly segment. Considering Jai Ram's strong RSS connections and strong political profile, he was the favorite for the top post and was chosen to lead the state. He was the first to become Chief Minister from Mandi district and he served as the sixth Chief Minister of Himachal Pradesh. After BJP lost the 2022 legislative  elections, Thakur resigned but was asked to continue in his post by the Governor until a new Chief Minister was selected.
On 11 December, his successor Sukhvinder Singh Sukhu took oath as Chief Minister of Himachal Pradesh.

Gallery

See also
 Jai Ram Thakur ministry

References

Bharatiya Janata Party politicians from Himachal Pradesh
1965 births
People from Mandi, Himachal Pradesh
State cabinet ministers of Himachal Pradesh
Living people
Himachal Pradesh MLAs 2017–2022
Chief ministers from Bharatiya Janata Party
Chief Ministers of Himachal Pradesh
Himachal Pradesh MLAs 1998–2003
Himachal Pradesh MLAs 2003–2007
Himachal Pradesh MLAs 2007–2012
Himachal Pradesh MLAs 2012–2017